Adjusted present value (APV) is a valuation method introduced in 1974 by Stewart Myers. The idea is to value the project as if it were all equity financed ("unleveraged"), and to then add the present value of the tax shield of debt – and other side effects.

Technically, an APV valuation model looks similar to a standard DCF model. However, instead of WACC, cash flows would be discounted at the unlevered cost of equity, and tax shields at either the cost of debt (Myers) or following later academics also with the unlevered cost of equity. APV and the standard DCF approaches should give the identical result if the capital structure remains stable.

According to Myers, the value of the levered firm (Value levered, Vl) is equal to the value of the firm with no debt (Value unlevered, Vu) plus the present value of the tax savings due to the tax deductibility of interest payments, the so-called value of the tax shield (VTS). Myers proposes calculating the VTS by discounting the tax savings at the cost of debt (Kd). The argument is that the risk of the tax saving arising from the use of debt is the same as the risk of the debt.

The method is to calculate the NPV of the project as if it is all-equity financed (so called "base case"). Then the base-case NPV is adjusted for the benefits of financing. Usually, the main benefit is a tax shield resulted from tax deductibility of interest payments. Another benefit can be a subsidized borrowing at sub-market rates. The APV method is especially effective when a leveraged buyout case is considered since the company is loaded with an extreme amount of debt, so the tax shield is substantial.

See also 
 Leverage (finance)
 Hamada's equation

References

Valuation (finance)
Financial models